Charles Edward Campbell (born January 23, 1981), known by his stage and pen name, Chuckie Campbell, is an American musician, poet, fiction writer, editor, publisher, and educator. He holds a B.A. in communications with an emphasis in Public Relations and a minor in Religion from Lee University, an M.A. in English and Creative Writing from Eastern Kentucky University, and a PhD in English Literature and Creative Writing from the University of Southern Mississippi.

Campbell is also an emerging hip hop artist. In 2014, he was the winner of the All WNY Music Awards for "Best Hip Hop/Rap Performer" and "Best New Artist." and in 2016, Artvoice Best of Buffalo Best Hip Hop Act and Best of Buffalo Best Original Music. Campbell's work has garnered positive press from online and print outlets such as The Huffington Post, The Source, Young Hollywood, Examiner.com, and UTG Review. His most recent album, Taking Back Tomorrow features Talib Kweli, Ras Kass, Nicole Atkins, Heidi Feek, and more. In 2017, he started the Taking Back Tomorrow Scholarship awarding a $1,500 annual scholarship to one Madison Central High School student, a college-bound high school senior, based on the demonstrated ability to overcome a life obstacle in pursuit of their higher education. Campbell continues to tour the United States, booked by Deep Thinka Records out of Buffalo, New York.

Biography

Early and personal life
Chuckie Campbell was raised in Richmond, Kentucky, attending Madison Central High School. While there, he excelled as an athlete, particularly on the basketball court, playing with high school stand outs Marquis Estill, Kenneal Jenkins, and Brandon Fritz. His play earned him a college scholarship to Lee University, where he would play four years of college basketball. Campbell would graduate in 2003 with his B.A. in communications and a minor in religious studies.

In the summer of 2004, Campbell was assaulted in a street fight by his friend and music mentor Ralph B. Prater. He would have facial reconstruction surgery and not make or perform music again for almost 7 years after the incident.

In the fall of 2004, Campbell began classes at Eastern Kentucky University in work toward his M.A. in English and Creative Writing. He studied under the likes of Charlie Sweet, Hal Blythe, and Young Smith, graduating in 2007. In 2008, he began his coursework toward his PhD at the University of Southern Mississippi, studying under Frederick Barthelme and Steven Barthelme, brothers of Donald Barthelme.

Campbell currently lives and writes in Buffalo, New York where he teaches college English and Communication courses at Bryant & Stratton College. As a tutor, teacher, and writer, he holds a number of accolades in the academic world, notably the Eastern Kentucky University Fiction Award (2007), for best critical and creative writing in a graduate course, the Madonna Marsden Fiction Award (2007), for exceptional creative writing in a short story collection, the Julia Visor Award (2010), presented annually by the National College Learning Center Association, the Ronald E. McNair Post-Baccalaurate Achievement Program Grant (2011), a grant provided by the Ronald E. McNair Post-Baccalaureate Achievement Program for preparing first-generation college students for doctoral studies, and The WNY Distinguished Faculty Award for Full-Time Faculty (2012 & 2016), honoring teachers at Bryant & Stratton College for instructional excellence.

Musical career
When Esente Center Stage selected Campbell as their emerging artist of the week, writer Peter Amara affirmed him as "super-lyrical" with words "that thrust" the listener "in the middle of the scenario," praising the rapper for his "intricate wordplay" and "incredibly fast flow". In early 2013, his song, "The Streets," produced by Marc Jones, struck a chord with listeners all across the nation, when it amassed the most overall votes in The Grammy's Amplifier Contest, accumulating 95,058 amps, listens and shares, more than any other artist in any other genre who participated in the contest. The song would be disqualified from the contest for improper interpolations of other musical compositions.

At the end of 2013, in response to the success of his song, "The Streets," Campbell released his first full-length album, More Die of Heartbreak, to positive reviews and critical acclaim. The album was produced entirely by Willie Breeding of The Breedings of Nashville, Tennessee and featured a number of emerging and established acts.

In September 2014, Campbell took home two All WNY Music Awards, one for Best New Artist (all genres) and the other for Best Rapper/Hip Hop Performer. In December 2014, Campbell signed a booking deal with Deep Thinka Records out of Buffalo, New York. In 2016, Campbell took home Best of Buffalo Awards for Best Hip Hop Artist and Best Original Music.

More Die of Heartbreak
More Die of Heartbreak, borrowing its title from Nobel prize winning author Saul Bellow's novel More Die of Heartbreak is an experimental hip hop project written by Chuckie Campbell and produced entirely by Willie Breeding of the brother/sister duo The Breedings. The album features highly notable guest appearances from members of the Wu-Tang Clan, Cappadonna and Solomon Childs, Cole Jonique of Tate Publishing & Enterprises, Willie and Erin Breeding of The Breedings, as well as rapper and producer for Disturbia Music Group, Block McCloud. The album itself is a return to form for Chuckie Campbell, a telling, drawing on the seven years after a violent physical assault left his jaw broken in two places, an event that would affect nearly every other human relationship that took place afterward. The album is dedicated to Ralph B. Prater, who committed suicide in March 2011. It is a reminder that for every one person who makes it out alive, more will die of heartbreak.

Track listing

Album art
More Die of Heartbreak's album art was illustrated by Kerby Rosanes of Sketchy Stories, based out of the Philippines. It was intricately detailed and tailored toward the content of the album, dealing with a number of evolving themes—heartbreak, suicide, domestic violence, substance abuse, city life, and racism, which are also contrasted with messages of hope, creativity, and inspiration—all emerging out of Leonardo da Vinci's "Vitruvian Man." In addition to the CD Packaging, Rosanes illustrated a 12 panel lyric booklet insert inside a DVD case.

Taking Back Tomorrow 
Taking Back Tomorrow is Campbell's second album to date. The project features Ras Kass (Mello Music Group), Talib Kweli (Javotti Media), Quadir Lateef (Ruff Ryders), Heidi Feek (daughter of country music stars Joey and Rory Feek), Nicole Atkins, Iesha Green, Mad Dukez, and many more. To date, the project has met almost universal acclaim: Layla Marino of Ellenwood writes, “Taking Back Tomorrow will likely be hailed as a masterpiece, just as his first album was, as this second effort more than lives up to the hype.” Perrin Daniel of Most Addictive Music also writes, "Every track on this album tells its own story...Fantastic use of dynamics, effects and change in flow makes for a fueled 11 track masterpiece that we recommend you cop your ears on as soon as possible." Jessica Brant of Word is Bond says, "Chuckie Campbell’s songs have messages that surrender us to our own energies; only through ourselves can we learn how to treat others, take control of our lives, and change circumstance."

Track listing

Album art
Artwork by The New York Times best-selling author/artist, Kerby Rosanes in six-panel DVD packaging with six panel fold-out, glued-in artist booklet, detailing all album production credits, contributions, and dedications.

Press
"[More Die of Heartbreak is] shrouded in an elegant veneer with an honest, and ofttimes, visceral undercoat in the form of words derived from real-life experiences and worldviews." – Brian Lion, UTG Review

"Still, leaving aside the guest features and the lush musical arrangements, the lovely production (courtesy of Will Breeding) and the melodic hooks, More Die of Heartbreak is at its best when Campbell finds moments to himself in the center of the storm. And it's those moments that make this record arguably my favorite hip-hop release of the year." – Craig Manning, Absolute Punk

"The rap talent's freshman album, More Die of Heartbreak, has garnered a great deal of praise across the web...With no pause, he's able to create moments that are intellectual and personal. He conveys the integrity of hip hop's forefathers, and the brazen talent of hip hop's future."—E Scritoria of BK United

"Campbell's work...attempts to tap into the condition of the human heart with all its shades of darkness and promise of hope despite attacks by those we trust."—Marcel Hidalgo of The Huffington Post

"Similar to Nas, The Roots and Macklemore, Chuckie Campbell has a sincere talent of story writing, poetry writing and music writing."—Amanda Cowen of Empty Lighthouse Magazine

"Rapper Chuckie Campbell has made a name for himself as being one of the few hip hop artists from Western New York to be noticed on a global scale...Campbell's aim seems to be to bring good writing back to the medium of hip hop, as well as to tell the story of the new hip hop, which has room for all races, creeds, and even genres of music. He fuses classical music, country and pop, all while spitting fast yet thoughtful and well-written lyrics over whatever genre strikes his fancy."—Layla Klamt of The Guardian Liberty Voice

Publications
Now defunct literary magazine, Sunsets and Silencers, was an annual print entity that published short fiction, flash fiction, creative non-fiction, poetry, essays, paintings, photography, recipes, and comic strips as a platform for emerging and established artists to showcase their work.

TEDx Youth Buffalo
Chuckie Campbell presented "Bond or Barrier: Language and Social Identity," a TED Talk addressing language and its ability to frame our social realities at States University of New York Buffalo State, playing host to WNY's only youth focused TED style conference, TEDxYouth@Buffalo's InnovationNEXT. In the talk, Campbell discusses race, class, creed, gender, sexual orientation, and other social constructions in terms of their description and re-description in the world. He specifically mentions the impact of social framing as it relates to young black males in the United States and reviews the events of the Trayvon Martin case.

Accolades, honors, and awards
Julia Visor Award, 2008, National College Learning Center Association
Esente Center Stage Emerging Artist of the Week, 2012
Distinguished Faculty Award, 2012, Bryant & Stratton College, Excellence in teaching as evidenced by effectiveness and ability to motivate students in and outside the classroom
All WNY Music Award for Best New Artist, 2014
All WNY Music Award for Best Rap/Hip Hop Performer, 2014
Hiplanta Album of the Week, 2014
Canalside Battle of the Bands Winner: Hip Hop, 2015
Artvoice Best of Buffalo Best Hip Hop Act, 2016
Artvoice Best of Buffalo Best Original Music, 2016
Distinguished Faculty Award, 2017, Bryant & Stratton College, Excellence in teaching as evidenced by effectiveness and ability to motivate students in and outside the classroom
A3C Music Festival "THIS IS MY YEAR" Winner, 2018

References

Links
Official Chuckie Campbell Artist Website: www.chuckiecampbellmusic.com
Chuckie Campbell Facebook artist page: https://www.facebook.com/chuckie.campbell
The Source (Article): http://thesource.com/2014/10/18/chuckie-campbell-tours-with-premrock-willie-green/
Blink by Chuckie Campbell (A short story): http://www.wordriot.org/template_2.php?ID=1838
Sunsets and Silencers (Print): http://www.magcloud.com/browse/issue/518865
Interview with UTG Review: http://www.underthegunreview.net/2014/01/09/utg-interview-chuckie-campbell-discusses-more-die-of-heartbreak/
Article by Bryant & Stratton College Tumblr Page: http://bryantstrattoncollege.tumblr.com/post/77916187650/chuckie-campbell-bringing-his-passion-for
Chuckie Campbell Signs Booking Deal with Deep Thinka Records: https://web.archive.org/web/20150219044016/http://www.deepthinka.com/news.php

1981 births
Living people
Eastern Kentucky University alumni
Lee University alumni
University of Southern Mississippi alumni
People from Richmond, Kentucky
Musicians from Buffalo, New York
Rappers from New York (state)
Rappers from Kentucky
Songwriters from Kentucky
Songwriters from New York (state)
21st-century American rappers